Maksymilian Rafailovych "Max" Levchin (born July 11, 1975) is a Ukrainian-American software engineer and businessman. In 1998, he co-founded the company that eventually became PayPal. Levchin made contributions to PayPal's anti-fraud efforts and was the co-creator of the Gausebeck-Levchin test, one of the first commercial implementations of a CAPTCHA challenge response human test.

He founded or co-founded the companies Slide.com, HVF, and Affirm. He was an early investor in Yelp and was their largest shareholder in 2012. He left a leadership role in Yelp in 2015.

Levchin was a producer for the movie Thank You for Smoking.

Early life and education
Born in Kyiv, Ukrainian SSR to a Ukrainian-Jewish family, Levchin moved to the United States and settled in Chicago in 1991. In an interview with Emily Chang of Bloomberg, Levchin discussed his overcoming adversity as a child. He had respiratory problems and doctors doubted his chance of living. With guidance from his grandmother and his parents he took up the clarinet to expand his lung capacity. He attended Mather High School, and then the University of Illinois at Urbana-Champaign, where he earned a bachelor's degree in computer science in 1997.

Business career
In the summer of 1995, Levchin and fellow University of Illinois students Luke Nosek and Scott Banister founded SponsorNet New Media.

PayPal
In 1998, Levchin and Peter Thiel founded Fieldlink, a security company that allowed users to store encrypted data on their PalmPilots and other PDA devices for handheld devices to serve as "digital wallets". After changing the company name to Confinity, they developed a popular payment product known as PayPal and focused on digital transfers of funds by PDA. The company merged with X.com in 2000, and in 2001, the company adopted the name PayPal after its main product. PayPal, Inc. went public in February 2002, and in July 2002 was acquired by eBay. Levchin's 2.3% stake in PayPal was worth approximately $34 million at the time of the acquisition.

Levchin is primarily known for his contributions to PayPal's anti-fraud efforts and is also the co-creator of the Gausebeck-Levchin test, one of the first commercial implementations of a CAPTCHA.

In 2002, he was named to the MIT Technology Review TR100 as one of the top 100 innovators in the world under the age of 35, as well as Innovator of the Year.

Levchin is one of a group of roughly twenty founders and former employees of PayPal who have become referred to as the "PayPal Mafia", due to their success in founding and investing in tech companies after leaving PayPal.

Slide

In 2004, Levchin founded Slide, a personal media-sharing service for social networking sites such as Myspace and Facebook. Slide was sold to Google in August 2010 for $182 million and, on August 25, Levchin joined the company as vice president of engineering. On August 26, 2011, Google announced it was shutting down Slide, and that Levchin was leaving the company.

HVF and Affirm
In late 2011, Levchin started a company called HVF (standing for "Hard, Valuable, and Fun") that was intended to explore and fund projects and companies in the area of leveraging data, such as data from analog sensors.

In early 2012, the financial technology company Affirm was spun out of HVF, with the goal of building the next-generation credit network. Affirm was created by Levchin, Palantir Technologies co-founder Nathan Gettings, and Jeff Kaditz of First Data. The company is based in San Francisco.

In 2013, HVF launched Glow, a fertility app that helps couples conceive naturally.
After Affirm had its initial public offering, Levchin's stake was estimated at about $2.5 billion.

Board memberships and investments
Levchin was a key early investor in Yelp, an online social networking and review service that started in 2004. He was the company's largest shareholder, owning more than 7 million shares as of 2012. Levchin served as chairman of Yelp's board of directors from its founding until July 2015.

Levchin is an investor in Evernote. He served on the company's board of directors from August 7, 2006, to 2016.

In December 2012, Levchin joined Yahoo's board of directors, and served until December 2015.

In 2015, Levchin was appointed to the U.S. Consumer Financial Protection Bureau (CFPB) advisory board for a three-year term, making him the first executive from Silicon Valley to be appointed to the board. In 2021, Levchin, after his experience on the advisory board at the CFPB, called for the necessity for the tech industry to engage more with regulators.

As of 2021 Levchin had an estimated net worth of a little over $3 billion USD.

In the media
Levchin appeared as a speaker at the 2007 Startup School organized by Y Combinator, where he described his own journey as an entrepreneur and the mistakes he made and lessons he learned. Levchin was also featured in "Brilliant Issue" of Portfolio by Condé Nast Publications. In 2022 Levchin was interviewed in an NPR podcast called "How I Built This" where he spoke about his early life and business endeavors including his role in PayPal.

Politics
Levchin was listed as one of the contributors to FWD.us, a Silicon Valley-based lobbying group spearheaded by Mark Zuckerberg and Joe Green. The group is intended to concentrate on immigration liberalization for high-skilled immigrants to the United States, improvements to education, and facilitating technological breakthroughs with broad public benefits. Levchin also narrated his personal experience as an immigrant in a video released by the group.

In 2013, amidst the controversy over mass surveillance and NSA espionage activities, Levchin defended the NSA. According to him, the agency was designed to protect the US from terrorism, so even if it oversteps its bounds, the public shouldn’t hate it. This opinion was opposed to that of many in the tech industry, including Michael Arrington who stated that NSA espionage does not stop terrorism - "it IS terrorism".

Personal life
In 2008, Levchin married his longtime girlfriend, Nellie Minkova. He has two children.

References

Further reading
 After Succeeding, Young Tycoons Try, Try Again — New York Times profile on Levchin

External links 

 Personal Website

1975 births
Living people
American computer businesspeople
American computer scientists
American investors
American technology chief executives
American technology company founders
Businesspeople from Chicago
Businesspeople in information technology
Jewish American scientists
PayPal people
Engineers from Kyiv
Ukrainian SSR emigrants to the United States
Ukrainian Jews
Grainger College of Engineering alumni
Directors of Yahoo!
American chief technology officers
21st-century American businesspeople
20th-century American businesspeople
Mather High School alumni
21st-century Ukrainian engineers